Melton South is a suburb in Melbourne, Victoria, Australia,  west of Melbourne's Central Business District, located within the City of Melton local government area. Melton South recorded a population of 11,362 at the 2021 census.

History

The Post Office opened on 1 January 1917, when Melton South was a sparsely populated rural area.

Transport
Melton railway station is located within Melton South. Rail is the major form of public transport connecting the satellite city of Melton with the Melbourne Central Business District and surrounding suburbs. The station is located on the Serviceton railway line and is served by V/Line trains. Transit Systems Victoria bus services 453, 455, 457, 458 and 459 connect Melton South and the station to the rest of Melton.

Facilities

Melton South has two shopping districts: one located on Exford Road; the other on Station Road. The centre on Station Road contains a Coles supermarket, chemist and a range of fresh food providers.

There are a number of parks in Melton South, including Blackwood Drive Reserve, Melton South Oval and Mount Carberry, a small hill located in a recreational reserve among suburban housing. There is also currently a Country Fire Authority station located there. A cycle path follows Toolern Creek to the east of the suburb: Toolern Creek Trail

Education

The area is home to many educational facilities

Primary State Schools:
 Coburn Primary School
 Melton South Primary School

Catholic Primary Schools:
 St Anthony of Padua Primary School

State Secondary Schools:
 Staughton College
 Melton Secondary College

Higher Education:
 Victoria University, Melton Campus

Health

The area has one General Practitioners office, on Brooklyn Road. The early 1990s saw the Melton Private Hospital close down to become a nursing home (located on Exford Road). The hospital was popular for many births in the 1970s and 1980s, however the private fees made the hospital less popular as time went by. Women must now go to Bacchus Marsh or Sunshine Hospitals to give birth.

Sport

Melton South has an Australian Rules team competing in the Ballarat Football League.

See also
 
 Melton (suburb)

References

Suburbs of Melbourne
Suburbs of the City of Melton